St Joseph's School is a school in Oamaru, the largest town in North Otago, in the South Island of New Zealand.  It was established by an order of Catholic nuns — Dominican Sisters — who started teaching in Oamaru in 1882. It is associated with St Patrick's Basilica, Oamaru

History
In 1884 the first classrooms were in the presbytery - up to five classes were taught there. The school was staffed by Dominican nuns. Priests visited the school taking an interest both in examinations and in cultural activities such as musical events.

In 1928 the Christian Brothers took over the running of St Patrick's primary school for boys in Oamaru and two Christian Brothers commuted daily from St Kevin's College (founded in 1927).

That school continued until a reorganisation in 1973 saw its closure. The younger boys went to St Joseph's while the older boys transferred to St Kevin's College. In 1984 there was a further reorganisation in which the St Joseph's became a full primary school for both boys and girls up to year 8. The red-brick building built for St Patrick's is now used for junior classes of St Joseph's while the older pupils are taught in newer buildings, closer to St Patrick's Basilica in Reed Street.

The school continues to maintain its Dominican connection especially with the starting of a "Dominican choir" in 2008. The school remains closely associated with St Kevin's College, and reports that 99% of its pupils go there after they leave St Joseph's.

Current status and activity
Currently, the school's principal is Mrs Jenny Jackson. The school lists student leadership as a major strength, reporting that pupils from years 3-8 sit on the school council.

The teacher who manages the middle syndicate is Miss Melanie Sloan. She suffers from early onset rheumatoid arthritis and has had her knee and hip joints replaced to relieve the disabling pain which had confined her to a wheelchair. In 2010, she received a Spirit of Attitude award for being "an unsung hero who lives life with positivity while facing extreme adversity."  She was presented with the supreme award for her positive attitude by minister Nick Smith in Auckland.  

There is a colony of little blue penguins in Oamaru and the students studied these as a research project to develop their essential skills and fulfil level 4 learning objectives in English, Social Studies and Science.

This was a Living Heritage project of the 2020 Communications Trust to promote digital literacy and so the main goal of the project was to construct a website about the penguins. This followed a similar project of bird monitoring performed as part of the Ministry of Education's LEARNZ programme.

References

Congregation of Christian Brothers in New Zealand
Catholic primary schools in New Zealand
Dominican schools in New Zealand
Schools in Otago
Buildings and structures in Oamaru